Joseph Robert Kapp (born March 19, 1938) is an American former football player, coach, and executive.  He played college football as a quarterback at the University of California, Berkeley.  Kapp played professionally in the Canadian Football League (CFL) with the Calgary Stampeders and the BC Lions and then in the National Football League (NFL) with the Minnesota Vikings and the Boston Patriots.  Kapp returned to his alma mater as head coach of the Golden Bears from 1982 to 1986. He was the general manager and president of the BC Lions in 1990.

Kapp is a member of the Canadian Football Hall of Fame, the BC Sports Hall of Fame, the BC Lions Wall of Fame, the College Football Hall of Fame, and the University of California Athletic Hall of Fame. Kapp's #22 jersey is one of eight numbers retired by the Lions. In November 2006, Kapp was voted to the Honour Roll of the CFL's top 50 players of the league's modern era by Canadian sports network TSN. Sports Illustrated once called him "The Toughest Chicano."  Kapp is the only player to play quarterback in the Super Bowl, Rose Bowl, and the Grey Cup.

Early years
Born in Santa Fe, New Mexico, Kapp's mother (Florence García) was of Mexican-American heritage, his father of German descent. Raised in California in the San Fernando Valley and Salinas, he played quarterback for Hart High School in Newhall, now a part of Santa Clarita.

Kapp played college football at the University of California, Berkeley, where he led the Golden Bears to a Pacific Coast Conference championship in 1958 and the Rose Bowl, where they lost to Iowa. This remains California's most recent Rose Bowl appearance. Kapp was named an All-American, and was also awarded the W. J. Voit Memorial Trophy in 1958 as the outstanding football player on the Pacific Coast. A two-sport athlete and fraternity member of Kappa Alpha Order in college, he also played on the basketball team and was a member of the 1956–57 and 1957–58 squads that won the Pacific Coast Conference championships. He earned a Bachelor of Arts degree in physical education from the university in 1959.

Professional career

Canadian Football League
Kapp was selected in the 18th round of the 1959 NFL Draft by the Washington Redskins, who owned his rights to play professional football in the United States.  After the draft, Washington did not contact him, so his only choice was to accept the offer from Jim Finks, the general manager of the Calgary Stampeders of the Canadian Football League (CFL).

Kapp joined the Calgary Stampeders of the CFL for his rookie season in 1959.  The following year, Kapp led Calgary to their first playoff appearance in years. The season was a difficult one, because he injured his knee against the Toronto Argonauts early in the season, but did not miss any games, because he played heavily taped.

In 1961, the BC Lions, then the CFL's newest franchise, traded four starting players to the Calgary Stampeders for Joe Kapp.  The move paid off for the Lions when Kapp led the team to a Grey Cup appearance in 1963. The following season, Kapp led the Lions to their first Grey Cup victory in 1964. However, the Lions proved unable to defend their championship in 1965.

By that time, Kapp had proven he was an elite quarterback, and also developed the reputation of being a tough player and a great leader. While most quarterbacks dislike being hit, Kapp was the opposite. He loved to hit and when he took off on a run he'd try to run over defenders.

Before the 1967 CFL season, Kapp made the decision to return to the U.S. to play pro football.  The AFL's Oakland Raiders, San Diego Chargers, and Houston Oilers were heavily pursuing him.

Kapp ended up signing with the NFL's Minnesota Vikings in a multi-player "trade" between the CFL and NFL teams, one of the very few transactions to ever occur between the two leagues.

The Minnesota Vikings in 1965 had drafted running back Jim Young out of Queen's University in Kingston, Ontario. He had spent the 1965 and 1966 seasons with the Vikings, but wanted to return to Canada. The BC Lions were very interested in acquiring Young, but the Toronto Argonauts had his CFL rights.

The Minnesota Vikings general manager was Jim Finks, who had brought Kapp to Canada in 1959, and their head coach was Bud Grant, who had faced Kapp while coaching the Winnipeg Blue Bombers. Both Finks and Grant thought Joe Kapp would be the best replacement for Fran Tarkenton, who had been traded to the New York Giants. To make this transaction possible, the BC Lions traded all-star defensive lineman Dick Fouts, and future Canadian Football Hall of Fame running back Bill Symons to Toronto for the CFL rights to future Canadian Football Hall of Fame wide receiver Jim Young. They then managed to get Kapp waived out of the CFL.  The Vikings managed to get Jim Young waived out of the NFL, which allowed the BC Lions to sign him. The expansion New Orleans Saints wanted Young and it took some work from Finks to keep them from claiming Young.  Kapp, now waived from the CFL, was free to sign with the Vikings, who had previously claimed his NFL playing rights from Washington.

National Football League
In 1967, Kapp's first season in the NFL, he started 11 of 14 games for the Vikings, compiling an unusual record of 3 wins, 5 losses and 3 ties. Kapp completed only 47 percent of his pass attempts with 8 touchdowns and 17 interceptions. Kapp also scored two rushing touchdowns. Of note, the team was winless without Kapp starting at quarterback. The Green Bay Packers won the division (and the Super Bowl).

In 1968, Kapp led Minnesota to their first ever playoff appearance, losing to the favored Baltimore Colts, 24–14. The Colts were upset a few weeks later by the New York Jets in Super Bowl III.

Early in the 1969 season, Kapp tied an all-time record when he threw for seven touchdown passes against the defending NFL champion Colts on September 28. He is tied with seven other players (Sid Luckman, Adrian Burk, George Blanda, Y. A. Tittle, Nick Foles, Peyton Manning, and Drew Brees). Kapp led the Vikings to a 12–2 record, and a berth in Super Bowl IV after defeating the Los Angeles Rams 23–20 in the Western Conference championship game, and the Cleveland Browns 27–7 in the last non-Super Bowl NFL Championship game. However, he was unable to lead the team to victory in the Super Bowl, as the Vikings lost 23–7 to the Kansas City Chiefs. On July 20, 1970, Sports Illustrated dubbed Kapp "The Toughest Chicano" on the cover of its weekly magazine. He received the team MVP, but refused the team MVP award, saying, "There is no one most valuable Viking. There are 40 most valuable Vikings."

Prior to the 1969 season, the Vikings had exercised the option clause of his contract, so Kapp had played the entire season without a new contract. It was unusual for teams to use the team's option and not to offer a new contract prior to a season.
This dispute made him a free agent for the  season, by the NFL's own rules.

Despite Kapp being a Super Bowl quarterback, no team in the NFL made contact with him until after the start of the 1970 regular season,
 when the Boston Patriots (1–1) signed him on October 2 to a four-year contract, making him the highest paid player in the league. Pete Rozelle stepped in and forced the Patriots to give up two number-one draft picks as compensation to the Vikings.  His first appearance for Boston was on October 11 at Kansas City, relieving starter Mike Taliaferro in the third quarter of a 23–10 loss.

The Patriots of 1970 were a poor-performing team and the late-arriving Kapp played poorly himself that season, leading the team to the 26-team league's worst record at 2–12. When the year ended, Rozelle demanded that Kapp sign a standard player contract. After conferring with his lawyer and the NFL Players Association, Kapp refused to sign.

With the top pick in the 1971 NFL Draft, the Patriots selected quarterback Jim Plunkett of Stanford, the winner of the Heisman Trophy. Kapp reported to the newly-renamed New England Patriots' training camp in 1971, refused to sign a standard contract, and departed. The headlines in the Boston papers read "KAPP QUITS!". After this incident Kapp never played again; his 12-year career as a professional football player was over.

Kapp started an anti-trust lawsuit vs. the NFL, claiming the standard NFL contract was unconstitutional and a restraint of trade. He won the summary judgment after four years. The court had ruled that Kapp's trade was indeed restrained. It was two years later (April 1, 1976) in the trial for damages, that the jury decided that Kapp was not damaged.

Although Kapp was not awarded any damages, in 1977 the rules at issue in the Kapp case were later revised, a new system was instituted, and a multimillion-dollar settlement was made between the NFL and the NFL Players Association.

Post-football playing career

Acting career
In the 1970s and early 1980s, Kapp appeared in several television programs as well as theatrical film titles. In most cases, the character roles were minor. Programs included Ironside, The Six Million Dollar Man, Adam-12, Emergency!, Police Woman, Captains and the Kings, and Medical Center. Movies included Climb An Angry Mountain (1972),  The World's Greatest Athlete (1973), The Longest Yard (1974), Breakheart Pass (1975), Two-Minute Warning (1976), Smash-Up on Interstate 5 (1976), Semi-Tough (1977), The Frisco Kid (1979), and Off Sides (Pigs vs. Freaks) (1984).

California head coach
In 1982, Kapp was hired as the head football coach at his alma mater, the University of California, Berkeley. He had never coached before.  In his first year as head coach, he was voted the Pacific-10 Conference Coach of the Year.

In December 1981, Kapp made a promise to the football team that he would not consume any of his favorite alcoholic beverage, tequila, until the Golden Bears reached the Rose Bowl, which they did not under Kapp; indeed, as of 2020, the Golden Bears have yet to return to the Rose Bowl – they were Pac-10 co-champions in 2006 but a loss to USC sent them to the Holiday Bowl instead (in a 1994 interview, Kapp stated that he had resorted to drinking rum instead).

Kapp had several philosophies while coaching at Cal. He called his special teams the "special forces." He told his players to play "One hundred percent for 60 minutes." He also wanted the players to have fun. On Sundays, he would have his players play a game of "garbazz", described as a mix of basketball and football where the only objective is to pass the ball downfield. There are no football rules such as offsides or forward passes.

Kapp's first season as head coach in 1982 concluded with The Play, the famous five-lateral kickoff return by Cal to score the winning touchdown on the final play of the Big Game against archrival Stanford.

During the 1986 season, the Bears lost to Boston College, defeated Washington State, then lost to San Jose State.  Following an embarrassing 50–18 loss at Washington on October 4, Kapp expressed frustration unzipping his pants in front of the Seattle media. He was notified that he would be released after the Big Game, played in Berkeley. The Bears responded to the student section's pre-game chants of "Win one for the zipper" by beating the Gator Bowl-bound #16 Cardinal 17–11, which gave Kapp a 3–2 record in the Big Game. He was carried off the field by his players, amid chanting from the student section, "We want Kapp!" echoing a cheer from his playing days with the Boston Patriots.

General manager of the BC Lions
In an effort to recapture their past glory, the BC Lions of the Canadian Football League (CFL) hired Kapp as the team's new general manager in 1990.  Kapp's tenure was marked by his tendency to recruit ex-NFL players such as Mark Gastineau whose best football days had passed.  Kapp was fired eleven games into the Lions' schedule, his most valuable legacy was the signing of quarterback Doug Flutie, who would blossom into a star in the CFL during the 1990s.

Sacramento Attack head coach
In 1992, Kapp was named the head coach of the Arena Football League's Los Angeles Wings, but the franchise never came into existence in Los Angeles, and moved to Sacramento as the Attack. The franchise went 4–6 under Kapp, losing in the first round of the playoffs to the Detroit Drive. After the season, the franchise moved to Miami, Florida.

Personal life
Kapp lives in Los Gatos, California, and makes himself available as a guest speaker.  He has a wife and four children and four grandchildren.  He was one of the owners of Kapp's Pizza Bar & Grill in Mountain View, California, which contained memorabilia from his career and closed in 2015. His son, Will, followed in his footsteps as a fullback at UC Berkeley. In 2015, grandson Frank Kapp, continued the Cal football tradition as a freshman tight end with the Golden Bears.

Kapp and fellow Canadian Football Hall of Fame player Angelo Mosca came to blows at a 2011 Canadian Football League Alumni luncheon.  The source of the bad blood between Kapp and Mosca is a hit Mosca made on Kapp's teammate Willie Fleming in the 1963 Grey Cup game.  The hit, which Kapp and many others considered dirty, forced Fleming out of the game.  Mosca's Tiger-Cats defeated Kapp's Lions 21–10 for the 1963 championship.

In February 2016, the San Jose Mercury News reported that Kapp was suffering from Alzheimer's disease.

Head coaching record

College

Other record
Until 2021, Kapp held the UC Berkeley record for most rushing yards by a quarterback. This was broken by Chase Garbers.

References

Bibliography

 Olsen, Jack – He Goes Where The Trouble Is. He is Joe Kapp, wandering quarterback, and last week he was in Kansas City, playing for the Boston Patriots, who are in deep trouble. Despite Kapp, the Pats lost, but wait until the new boy learns the system. Sports Illustrated, October 19, 1970

External links
 
 
 

1938 births
American football quarterbacks
American men's basketball players
American players of Canadian football
American people of German descent
American sportspeople of Mexican descent
BC Lions general managers
BC Lions players
BC Lions team presidents
Boston Patriots players
Calgary Stampeders players
California Golden Bears football coaches
California Golden Bears football players
California Golden Bears men's basketball players
Canadian Football Hall of Fame inductees
Canadian football quarterbacks
College Football Hall of Fame inductees
Florida Bobcats coaches
Living people
Minnesota Vikings players
New England Patriots players
Players of American football from California
Sportspeople from Salinas, California
Sportspeople from Santa Clarita, California
Sportspeople from Santa Fe, New Mexico
Western Conference Pro Bowl players